Sarmargan Naleyn (also Romanized as Sarmargān Na‘leyn; also known as Sepīdār Na‘leyn) is a village in Gavork-e Nalin Rural District, Vazineh District, Sardasht County, West Azerbaijan Province, Iran. At the 2006 census, its population was 97, in 13 families.

References 

Populated places in Sardasht County